Mbweni may refer to:

Mbweni, Dar Es Salaam, Tanzania
Mbweni, Zanzibar, Tanzania